At the Close of a Century is a box-set album of Stevie Wonder's greatest hits from the 1960s through the 1990s. The box set spans four CDs and the songs are placed in chronological order. It features nearly all of his most critically acclaimed songs, singles and album tracks alike. It reached #100 on the Billboard Top R&B/Hip-Hop Albums chart in 2000. The box set encompasses a total of 70 songs, including every track from Wonder's 1973 album Innervisions except for "Jesus Children of America."

Track listing

Disc 1

Disc 2

Disc 3

Disc 4

References

1999 greatest hits albums
Stevie Wonder compilation albums
Motown compilation albums
Albums produced by Henry Cosby
Albums produced by Clarence Paul
Albums produced by William "Mickey" Stevenson
Albums produced by Stevie Wonder